The Crayon 301 is a 301 lap ( annual NASCAR Cup Series stock car race held at the New Hampshire Motor Speedway in Loudon, New Hampshire.

Christopher Bell is the defending winner, having won it in 2022.

History
The race has been traditionally run in July, but from 2007 to 2010 it was run in late June or early July as the race preceding the Coke Zero 400 in order to allow that race to run as close to the 4th of July as possible. In 2011, the race returned to its traditional mid-July date. From its inaugural running in 1993 through 2007 the race was 300 laps, but after O. Bruton Smith and his company SMI bought the track, their first date was given the moniker of the extra mile and was increased to 301 laps. In 2008, Kurt Busch won the race after it was called due to rain after 284 laps. One year later, Joey Logano became the youngest winner in NASCAR Cup Series history after the race was also shortened because of rain after 273 laps, at the age of 19 years, 1 month, and 4 days. Starting in 2018, it became the only event at the track because their fall race would be moved to Las Vegas Motor Speedway.

During the practice for the 2000 event, Kenny Irwin Jr. was killed after he lost control of his car, which slammed head on into the wall, causing it to flip onto its side. His cause of death, basilar skull fracture, was the same cause that killed Busch Series driver Adam Petty eight weeks prior at Busch 200 at the same track, leading NASCAR to make significant rule changes to maintain driver safety, including an experiment on using a restrictor plate for the next New Hampshire Cup race that season, the Dura Lube 300.

Race sponsorship

Newell Rubbermaid, through its Lenox Industrial Tools subsidiary, was the title sponsor of the race from 2006 to 2012. Starting in 2008, organizers added an extra lap to represent that Lenox Industrial Tools "is looking for users and suppliers of industrial tools that go the extra mile, whose jobs are physically demanding, day after day, and still find time to contribute to their communities in a meaningful way." The race was dubbed "The Extra Mile at the Magic Mile." After Lenox Industrial Tools left as title sponsor, Camping World picked up the sponsorship of the event through its RV Sales department for 2013 and 2014, and since the 301 moniker became popular with the fans, NHMS decided to keep their July event 301 laps long. In fact, the first two races with the 301 lap distance did not go the whole distance.

In 2017, the race (along with the track's Xfinity Series race the day before) received sponsorship from water sports store Overton's (which is owned by Camping World), branding it the Overton's 301.

Starting in 2018, Foxwoods Resort Casino, located in Ledyard, Connecticut, became the title sponsor of the race after announcing a multi-year sponsorship agreement with the racetrack on May 31, 2018.

In 2022, Ambetter, which was the title sponsor of the Xfinity Series race at New Hampshire in 2021, became the title sponsor of the race, replacing Foxwoods. Before the 2022 Cup Series race at the track, it was announced that Crayon Software Experts, which replaced Ambetter as the title sponsor of the Xfinity Series race at New Hampshire in 2022, would sponsor the track's Cup Series race in 2023. It had been announced the previous week that Ambetter would move their title sponsorship to the spring Cup Series race at Atlanta in 2023.

Trophy
Unlike other races, the trophy is in the form of an American lobster provided by Makris Lobster and Steak House of Concord, New Hampshire. The restaurant selects the largest lobster in its tank, usually weighing in at 20 lbs or more. After the winning driver poses with the lobster on victory lane, Makris pressure cooks it and sends the meat to the winning pit crew while a taxidermist reassembles the shell and mounts it on a trophy for the driver.

There were some exceptions to this tradition. After winning the race in 2008, Kurt Busch donated his lobster to the New England Aquarium; it died shortly after its arrival.

Past winners

Notes
2000, 2008, and 2009: Race shortened due to rain.
2006, 2013, and 2014: Race extended due to a NASCAR overtime finish.
2020: Race postponed from July 19 to August 2 due to schedule changes resulting from the COVID-19 pandemic.
2021: Race delayed due to rain and shortened by eight laps due to darkness.

Multiple winners (drivers)

Multiple winners (teams)

Manufacturer wins

References

External links
 

1993 establishments in New Hampshire
 
NASCAR Cup Series races
Recurring sporting events established in 1993
Annual sporting events in the United States